Kyle MacLeod (born December 23, 1992) is an American soccer player.

Career

College and amateur
MacLeod started his college career at the University of San Francisco between 2011 and 2013, before transferring to the University of San Diego for his senior year in 2014. MacLeod scored the goal to secure the West Coast Conference championship in 2014 against the University of San Francisco.

MacLeod also appeared for Premier Development League side Orange County Blues U-23 from 2012 to 2014.

Professional
Macleod made his professional debut with the League of Ireland club Cork City FC in 2016.

MacLeod later signed with United Soccer League club the Tulsa Roughnecks in June 2016.

References

External links
 SF Dons bio
 Toreros bio

1992 births
Living people
American soccer players
San Francisco Dons men's soccer players
San Diego Toreros men's soccer players
FC Tulsa players
Association football forwards
Soccer players from California
USL League Two players
USL Championship players
Orange County SC U-23 players
Sportspeople from Newport Beach, California